Rajvir Singh Diler (born 1 May 1958) is an Indian politician and member of the Lok Sabha, from Hathras constituency, Uttar Pradesh representing the Bharatiya Janata Party. His father Kishan Lal Diler was former MP from Hathras. He was elected to Uttar Pradesh Legislative Assembly from Iglas in 2017, but he resigned.

References 

India MPs 2019–present
Lok Sabha members from Uttar Pradesh
Living people
Bharatiya Janata Party politicians from Uttar Pradesh
1958 births
People from Uttar Pradesh